Tierra Blanca is a city and its surrounding municipality of the same name located in the south-central part of the state of Veracruz in Mexico. At the 2005 census the city had a population of 44,171 inhabitants, and 47,824 in 2015. The city serves as the municipal seat of the municipality, which has an area of 1,363.76 km² (526.55 sq mi) and a population of 86,075 inhabitants (2005) and 106,277 (2015). Its largest other community is the town of Joachín.

The municipality has been torn by violence in the 2010s and 2020s. On May 30, 2020, Francisco Navarette Serna, founder of ′′El Sol de Terra Blance,′′ was one of seven people killed at a party held during the height of the COVID-19 pandemic in Mexico. In 2016, Navarette Serna was accused of being the local drug lord responsible for the murder of five men between 16 and 27 years old from Acayucan in February 2016. Their bodies were crushed to avoid identification.

References

Encuesta Intercensal 2015 INEGI: Instituto Nacional de Estadística, Geografía e Informática
Veracruz Enciclopedia de los Municipios de México

External links
Municipio de Tierra Blanca Official website

Municipalities of Veracruz